Terrence Arnold Woodyard (born December 26, 1982) is an American former professional basketball player.

Early life and college
Born in Madrid, Spain, Woodyard graduated from Mount Zion High School and played college basketball at Western Carolina University from 2001 to 2005, where he was roommates with future Houston Rockets guard Kevin Martin. In four seasons, Woodyard played 107 games and averaged 3.8 points, 2.1 rebounds, and 0.6 assists per game. He made 45.2% of shots from the field.

Career

Atlanta Vision (2005)
Woodyard began his career with the Atlanta Vision of the American Basketball Association.

Georgia Gwizzlies (2006)

Anderson Heat (2006)

Seattle Mountaineers (2007)
On December 13, 2006, Woodyard signed with the Seattle Mountaineers of the International Basketball League.

Leicester Riders (2007-2008)
On September 14, 2007, Woodward and former Western Carolina teammate Kyle Greathouse signed with the Leicester Riders of the British Basketball League. Woodyard has been a leading scorer; on December 16, he tied with Rod Wellington to score 22 points to help Leicester beat the London Capital 97–82.

Basketball Japan League (2008-2011)
After his season with the Leicester Riders, Woodyard signed with the Toyama Grouses of the Basketball Japan League in October 2008.  With the Saitama Broncos in the same league, Woodward was among only two players averaging double-digit scoring during the 2009–2010 season; he averaged 12.2.

National Basketball League of Canada (2011-present)
Woodyard first came onto the Saint John Mill Rats radar this past April while playing with the Sendai Japan All-Stars in a charity game at Harbour Station.  This led to the Mill Rats signing him for the preseason.  However, Woodyard was cut by the Mill Rats before the regular season started.

On November 2, it was announced that the Moncton Miracles had signed Woodyard to their active roster.

Notes

1982 births
Living people
African-American basketball players
American expatriate basketball people in Canada
American expatriate basketball people in Japan
American expatriate basketball people in the United Kingdom
Basketball players from Georgia (U.S. state)
Leicester Riders players
Moncton Miracles players
People from Clayton County, Georgia
Saint John Mill Rats players
Saitama Broncos players
Sendai 89ers players
Sportspeople from the Atlanta metropolitan area
Basketball players from Madrid
Toyama Grouses players
Western Carolina Catamounts men's basketball players
American men's basketball players
Forwards (basketball)
21st-century African-American sportspeople
20th-century African-American people